UMRA is an abbreviation that stands for:
Unión Militar Republicana Antifascista, an anti-fascist organization for military members in Spain during the Second Spanish Republic
Unfunded Mandates Reform Act of 1995, a U.S. bill intended to limit the number of unfunded mandates that can be enacted by the federal government